The Kaldoaivi Wilderness Area is the largest wilderness reserve in Finland, located in the municipalities of Utsjoki and Inari in Lapland. It was established in 1991 like all the other 11 wilderness areas in Lapland. The large area of roadless wilderness continues outside the borders of Finland and the official area to Norway. It is governed by the Metsähallitus.

References

Protected areas established in 1991
1991 establishments in Finland
Wilderness areas of Finland